This is a list of adult animated web series. Works in this medium could be considered adult for any number of reasons, which include the incorporation of explicit or suggestive sexual content, graphic violence, profane language, dark humour, or other thematic elements inappropriate for children. Works in this genre may explore philosophical, political, or social issues. Some productions are noted for their complex and/or experimental storytelling and animation techniques. Adult animation is typically defined as animation which skews toward adults. It is also described as something that "formative youths should stay far, far away from" or has adult humor and comes in various styles, but especially sitcoms and comedies. These animations can also "appeal to wide swaths of viewers," including those aged 18–34. Adweek called adult animation "animated projects aimed at grown-ups, not kids."

This list does not include Japanese, Chinese, or Korean series, as it is much more common in these regions. It also does not include animated films or television series, including those on streaming video on demand platforms such as Netflix, Hulu, Amazon Prime Video, HBO Max, Peacock, Disney+, Apple TV+, and Paramount+.

1990s

2000s

2010s

2020s

See also
 LGBT representation in American adult animation
 Modern animation in the United States
 Lists of animated feature films
 Independent animation
 Animation in the United States in the television era
 Cartoon violence

Notes

References

 Adult
Adult